General Electric Manufacturing Company Limited is a Bangladesh government owned electric company that manufactures electric transformers. Eng. Ashraful islam is the managing director of the company. It is a subsidiary of Bangladesh Steel and Engineering Corporation.

History
General Electric Manufacturing Company Limited was established in 1972 by the Government of Bangladesh. It was built with technical assistance of M/s. Promash Export, a company of the Soviet Union, to manufacture electric equipment like power transformers and completed in 1978. It was transformed into a limited company in 1979. It is located in Patenga, Chittagong. It owns the largest transformer factory in Bangladesh.

In March 2019, the company signed an agreement with Engineering Dimension, a Saudi Arabian company, worth 35 million taka.

References

1972 establishments in Bangladesh
Manufacturing companies based in Chittagong
Government-owned companies of Bangladesh